The 2013 Amgen Tour of California was the eighth running of the Tour of California cycling stage race. It was held from May 12–19, and was rated as a 2.HC event on the UCI America Tour. It began in Escondido and finished in Santa Rosa.

It was won by the American Tejay van Garderen, the first success in the general classification of a stage race in the career of the then 24-year-old rider. The sprints jersey was handed to Slovak Peter Sagan, who won it for the fourth time in four consecutive presences at the Tour. Carter Jones prevailed in the mountains classification thanks to his participation in numerous breakaways, and Lawson Craddock of  earned the youth classification jersey at 21 years of age.

Prior to the race
The winner of the 2012 race, Robert Gesink, did not participate in this edition as he was riding the Giro d'Italia. For this edition, the UCI elected to reintroduce blood testing based on the biological passport, as USADA would also take care of pre-race testing, but no cooperation was established between the two agencies. The favorites for the overall classification have been deemed to be Tejay van Garderen, Haimar Zubeldia, Cameron Meyer, Michael Rogers (who won the 2010 edition and was making a comeback to the race), Thomas De Gendt and Francisco Mancebo, among others. Another rider to watch was David Zabriskie, who finished second in the general classification of the race on four occasions including the latest edition, without ever winning the top honors.

Riders looking for stage wins in sprints included Slovak Peter Sagan (who held the record for stage wins in the Tour at eight going into the event), Belgian Gianni Meersman and Dutch Boy Van Poppel. Also in contention for stage honors were Aussie Michael Matthews, American Tyler Farrar and Belgian Philippe Gilbert. 2010 Tour de France winner Andy Schleck was also present.

Participating teams
Sixteen teams participated in the 2013 Tour of California, including eight UCI World Tour teams, three UCI Professional Continental teams, and five UCI Continental teams. They were:

Schedule

Stages

Stage 1

The only intermediate sprint was disputed in Ramona after  of racing and before the difficulties of the day.

One rider missed the start of the first stage, Ben King had to withdraw due to a hand injury suffered while training two days prior. Early in the race, a breakaway of four riders formed: Zak Dempster, Marsh Cooper, James Stemper, and Carter Jones. The quartet built a maximum lead of ten minutes, Jones grabbed the intermediate sprint points, and Dempster was first atop the Mesa Grande (cat. 4). The latter was dropped on the slopes of Palomar Mountain, a ten mile long challenge featuring a 4,5% average slope, which Jones crested first. The leading group, now reduced to a trio, cooperated on the twisting descent and on the flatter sections afterward, until they tackled the last categorized difficulty, the Cole Grade. The Canadian Marsh Cooper was unable to follow the pace on the short but steep climb, as Stemper and Jones powered away.

Peter Sagan was dropped on the Cole Grade, but some teammates folded back to help him reintegrate the main group, which he did. In the run-in to Escondido, world champion Philippe Gilbert was distanced, and Luis Amaran of  took a nasty spill, but was able to remount and finish the stage. As the two shook hands to congratulate each other for the big effort, Lieuwe Westra jumped out of the peloton, and was joined by Francisco Mancebo. Sagan then had problems with his rear derailleur and was soon relegated to the back of the peloton, where he sorted out the problem without leaving the saddle. The Mancebo-Westra duo cooperated well, taking advantage of the sprinters' teams confusion, and managed to resist. Westra outsprinted Mancebo to take 's second win of the year and the 10 seconds bonification. Sagan won the sprint of the bunch, coming in six seconds after the escapees. Thanks to their long escape, Jones earned the mountains classification jersey while his fellow escapee Stemper won the "Most Courageous" rider jersey.

Stage 2

Once again the highest point of the course was situated midway through the race atop the Category 1 Mountain Center climb, which translated to a  gain in altitude. Another intermediate sprint was located at the foot of the descent, then the road went flat until the final ascent to the finish in the vicinity of Palm Springs, which was also a Category 1 affair.

The heat was once again a major factor in the race, as the temperatures reached  and nearly 120 degrees on the pavement. Afterwards, riders tweeted pictures of blisters from burns on their bodies from lying on the black pavement after the stage. The riders kept themselves cool with ice packs taken from the team cars, tucking them in their jerseys as they were racing through the desert landscape. The day's early breakaway included 's Pat McCarty, Ben Jacques-Maynes, Scott Zwizanski and Sylvain Chavanel. McCarty was the better placed rider in the overall classification at only 16 seconds, which hindered the break's chances greatly. Nevertheless, they held a maximum lead of twelve minutes over the bunch. McCarty took the first intermediate sprint points. The gap started melting when they crested Mountain Center as Jacques-Maynes took the maximum King of the Mountains points. They negotiated the twisting descent to Palm Springs, passing through the last intermediate sprint without contesting it (Zwizanski happened to be at the front). Back in the peloton, race leader Lieuwe Westra suffered a flat tire, but was able to negotiate his way back to the main field by weaving through the team cars.

With  to cover and a gap of three minutes, disagreement started to appear in the lead group as Zwizanski placed an acceleration, followed by a dig from Jacques-Maynes, who spent two kilometers alone in front before the quartet got back together. The peloton started breaking rapidly thanks to the very steep gradient. Lieuwe Westra was soon distanced, and lost more than 9 minutes and the yellow jersey, finishing near pre-race favorites, Andy Schleck and David Zabriskie. Acevedo put a last acceleration in and distanced Van Garderen, earning the biggest victory of his career so far and taking the leader's jersey. For his efforts in the break, Chavanel earned the "Most Courageous" rider award.

Stage 3

Stage 3 was composed of numerous Category 4 climbs as opposed to the two prior stages which included one or two major difficulties. The first one was situated on Munz Ranch road, the following two occurred on Lake Hughes Road, after which two intermediate sprints were disputed; one near Lake Hughes and another one in the Leona Valley. The last categorized bump was on the Bouquet Canyon Road,  from the finish line which was reached via mostly downhill roads in Santa Clarita.

The temperatures were a lot more favorable to the riders on Stage 3. 41-year-old Jens Voigt attacked right as the flag was dropped and a 23 men breakaway formed. The large group stayed free for  until the first categorized climb, as they were reeled back in by the leader's team, . Carter Jones took the KOM points, securing the mountains classification jersey for another day. At the same moment, another attempt at forming an escape succeeded: Andy Schleck, Gavin Mannion, Chad Beyer and points classification leader Lieuwe Westra steered clear of the bunch. The gap maximized at 4:45, Beyer took the 2 following King Of the Mountains contests, and the quartet did not contest the intermediate sprints, leaving the points to Westra, who wanted to comfort his lead for the Green Jersey. Beyer had other ideas, soldiered onward and was caught shortly. This last effort netted him the "Most Courageous" rider jersey.

As the quasi-totality of the remaining peloton in the Tour came charging in Santa Clarita, the lead-out trains tried to sort themselves out. As the sprint was unleashed, Sagan was still behind the first row, but managed to find an opening on the right side of the road to beat Matthews by half-a-wheel. This was the ninth victory at the Tour of California for Sagan, who improved his own record.

Stage 4

The stage started with a very long  downhill false-flat at the bottom of which an intermediate sprint was disputed in Santa Paula. Immediately after the sprint, the road kicked up to the Category 4 Dennison Grade. The latter climb was featured at the midway point of the stage once again. Then the route was mainly flat or downhill.

A notable non-starter for the fourth stage was Philippe Gilbert, who packed his bags since his wife was delivering their baby a little sooner than expected. A flurry of attacks punctuated the first  until a move of 5 Americans and a Canadian formed, Nathan Brown, Frank Pipp, the previous day's "Most Courageous" rider Chad Beyer, James Stemper, Chris Baldwin and Canadian Marsh Cooper. Baldwin was the better placed rider in the overall, 3:19 down on race leader Janier Acevedo, and became the virtual leader at one point as the gap culminated to 3:30. Stemper won the first intermediate sprint in Santa Paula, as Baldwin was first to cross the line of the Category 4 Dennison Grade and at the intermediate sprint after the descent in Ojai. The 21-year-old Brown was aggressive on the last climb of the day, breaking away to take maximum points, and the group reformed on the descent.

Brown gained the privilege to wear the "Most Courageous" rider jersey on the next stage for this last-ditch effort. As the sprint unfolded, Tyler Farrar was well positioned at the front, and powered away with Ken Hanson coming in second. There were no changes in the overall classification, but the Green jersey changed hands and went to Peter Sagan, who finished fifth.

Stage 5

Stage 5 counted only one categorized climb, which was disputed at the beginning of the race, the San Marcos Pass which was graded as a Category 2 and whose summit was situated at the  mark. From that point, the terrain was undulating or flat and passed through 3 intermediate sprints situated in Orcutt, Guadalupe and then Arroyo Grande.

The stage was deemed to be a sprinters' affair due to the fairly flat terrain after the Category 2 San Marcos Pass, and the early breakaway detached themselves before the difficulty: Thomas De Gendt, Kai Chun Feng and mountains classification leader Carter Jones. Jones added valuable points to his tally as he crested the San Marcos Pass in first position. The three escapees enjoyed a maximum freedom of 8:30 before the bunch decided it was enough and started working. Soon,  and  contributed to help the first echelon take large. The early break was caught then quickly shed off the back as Tejay van Garderen, Michael Rogers Cameron Meyer and Matthew Busche were in the lead group, all of them well-placed general classification contenders. Peter Sagan was also in the escape, isolated as he had no teammates with him. The group clawed its way to a steady growth of their advantage. Caught in the main group at the back were race leader Janier Acevedo, third placed Philip Deignan, Chad Haga (seventh) and Lawson Craddock (ninth).

The chase was mostly led by  while  also chipped in. As the lead group continued to gain time, Busche told his teammate Voigt "you look pretty good, why don't you go for the stage?". He crossed the line in Avila Beach solo, registering his first victory of the year. The large group of escapees he was part of came in 6 seconds later, and the whole peloton a minute and seven seconds in arrears. The general classification was reshuffled, with Van Garderen taking the lead from Acevedo and Michael Rogers going from fifth to second. 41-year-old veteran Voigt said in his typical good humored fashion when interviewed after his victory: "I just did the same move I've been doing since the ice age, and I couldn't believe they let me go. Once I get 20 seconds, I'm gone. I looked back and said, 'I can't believe they're giving me 20 seconds, don't they know?'

Stage 6

The individual time trial stage started with a small climb coming  after the starting ramp, then became mostly flat until the final . From that point it kicked up for an elevation gain of almost , featuring some sections at a gradient of 10%.

A notable rider could not start the stage, David Zabriskie crashed during a reconnaissance ride and had to abandon. A choice faced the riders as they devised their strategy for the time trial: should they lose time at the foot of the final climb to switch to a normal road bike or power through with their aerodynamic machine not suited for steep climbing? The choices differed, as Michael Rogers opted for a change, while Tejay van Garderen continued on the TT bike. Kristijan Koren was the first rider to complete the course under the 51 minutes bar, but then Rohan Dennis exploded that time with a chrono of 49 minutes 20 seconds. Frenchman Sylvain Chavanel then scored an honorable time, a little more than a minute in arrears of Dennis. Overall contenders who lost time on the last day's echelon, Lawson Craddock, Chad Haga, Philip Deignan and Francisco Mancebo all performed well enough to keep their top ten overall placings.

Meanwhile, former leader Janier Acevedo suffered a mechanical which forced him to change machines, he would ultimately finish 18th, 2:41 behind the winner. First stage winner Lieuwe Westra then bested Dennis' time by 5 seconds, establishing a new mark. Philip Deignan rode his way to 24th, a time that would make him lose 3 spots, from fifth to eighth. Cameron Meyer put in a good performance with a time of 50' 20", which translated in a jump from sixth place to third. Michael Rogers then signed what would become the fourth fastest time of the day, saying afterward that the wind played a big role. Being the overall classification leader, Van Garderen rolled off the ramp last, and confirmed his overall ambitions by crushing the stage, registering the only time below 49 minutes (48' 52", 22 seconds faster than Westra). It was Van Garderen's first victory of the year despite some notable results earlier in the season and he declared after the event: "I don't want to count my chickens before they hatch, but I'm ready to win, and I think it's about time. I think now I’m finally mature enough to pull through to the end. I think I’m ready to do it."

Stage 7

Dubbed as the queen stage of the Tour, this stage featured three categorized affairs. After  of racing, the riders  tackled with the first climb of the day, then it was mostly downhill or flat until they got to the Patterson Pass about halfway through the course. The only intermediate sprint was situated at the bottom of the descent while the riders crossed Livermore, after which they climbed the "Hors Catégorie" Mount Diablo to its very top ( at an average 5.8%, the last  kicking up at a steep 16%).

After 7 riders attempted to break free and failed, a successful move was initiated by Juan Antonio Flecha and his teammate Lieuwe Westra. Flecha was ultimately dropped, but ten riders remained in the fold: Westra, Carter Jones, Andy Schleck and his teammate Laurent Didier, David De la Cruz, Carlos Verona, Kristijan Koren, Chris Butler, Nathan Brown and Nate English. Jones crested the first two difficulties of the day in the lead, insuring that he will be crowned the "Best climber" of the Tour, unless he would happen to be unable to complete stage 8. The break splintered, leaving only Westra and De la Cruz in front in a bid for a stage win.

The peloton hit the climb with a strong  presence at the front, sheltering race leader Tejay van Garderen. The riders from the early break were reeled in progressively, and Gavin Mannion took a plunge in a grassy roadside ditch, with no apparent damage. The Spaniard continued onward and cruised past the Westra-De la Cruz duo. With  to go and an ever-thinning field, Janier Acevedo jumped out and caught Mancebo, who was unable to follow. Back in the yellow jersey group, third-placed Cameron Meyer was beginning to suffer and was dropped. It was then Leopold König's turn to attack, joining Acevedo. The pair went together under the flamme rouge as the crowd cheered them on. 's König placed an ultimate dig  from the line, and Acevedo could not answer. The latter finished 7 seconds in arrears of König, ravishing the third overall spot from Meyer, and Van Garderen came in 5 seconds later, cementing his lead in the overall classification.

Stage 8

An intermediate sprint was disputed after  of racing. The final  of the course going into Santa Rosa were basically pan flat.

Considering the flat terrain and the time gaps, three of the Overall jerseys (General, Mountains and Youth classifications) were likely to remain on their respective wearers, provided no accidents or large breakaway occurred. It was not the case for the Points classification though, as Peter Sagan only had a single point of an advantage over Tyler Farrar (38 vs. 37) The start signal was given after riders had crossed the Golden Gate Bridge, and eternal breakaway participant Thomas De Gendt immediately took large, accompanied by 's Jason McCartney and 's Antoine Duchesne. The points on offer at the intermediate sprint in Point Reyes Station were swept up by the trio, as only the three first riders were awarded points, leaving the suspense for the Green Jersey for the finish line. De Gendt suffered a mechanical where he had to change his machine, and Duchesne commented about the difference that bike change made after the stage: "He was really pulling hard in the beginning and doing the most of the work, but after his mechanical – that wasn't his bike and he said that he felt terrible; the seat was too high and stuff like that – so it kind of slowed us down a little."

Duchesne accelerated to get away from the group as they were entering Santa Rosa, but McCartney closed the gap as De Gendt fold back. As he crossed the line, he made a victory salute, one arm in the air, the other arm making the gesture reminiscent  of a person trying to start a lawn mower. With that win, Sagan secured the Points classification jersey, as there were no other changes in the classifications. Sagan dedicated his victory to 11-year-old Alex Shepherd, cancer sufferer and cycling enthusiast. Tejay van Garderen won the first stage race in his career, and declared after the feat, "I've known for years that I'm capable of a ride like that", he said. "Finally for it all to fall in place, it's really special."

Classification leadership

In the 2013 Tour of California, 5 jerseys are awarded. For the general classification, calculated by adding the finishing times of the stages per cyclist, the leader receives a yellow jersey (Amgen Race Leader Jersey). This classification is considered the most important of the Tour of California, and the winner of the general classification will be considered the winner of the Tour of California.

Additionally, there is also a sprints classification, akin to what is called the points classification in other races, which awards a green jersey (Visit California Sprint Jersey). In the sprints classification, cyclists receive points for finishing in the top 15 in a stage. In addition, some points can be won in intermediate sprints.

There is also a mountains classification, which awards a Polka dots jersey (Nissan King of the Mountain Jersey). In the mountains classifications, points are won by reaching the top of a mountain before other cyclists. Each climb is categorized, either first, second, third, or fourth category, with more points available for the harder climbs.

There is also a youth classification. This classification is calculated the same way as the general classification, but only young cyclists (under 23) are included. The leader of the young rider classification receives a white and green jersey (Crunchies Best Young Rider Jersey).

The last jersey is awarded to the most combative rider of a stage for him to wear on the next stage. It is generally awarded to a rider who attacks constantly or spends a lot of time in the breakaways. This jersey is blue, white and yellow (Amgen Breakaway from Cancer© Most Courageous Rider Jersey).

There is also a classification for teams. In this classification, the times of the best three cyclists per stage are added, and the team with the lowest time is the leader.

Classification standings

General classification

Points classification

King of the Mountains classification

Young Riders classification

Team classification

References

External links

Tour of California
Tour of California
Tour of California
Tour of California